The 1973 World Championship Tennis Finals was a men's tennis tournament played on indoor carpet courts. It was the 3rd edition of the WCT Finals and was part of the 1973 World Championship Tennis circuit. It was played at the Moody Coliseum in Dallas, Texas in the United States and was held from May 7 through May 13, 1973. First-seeded Stan Smith won the singles title and earned $50,000 first-prize money.

Final

Singles

 Stan Smith defeated  Arthur Ashe 6–3, 6–3, 4–6, 6–4 
 It was Smith's 7th singles title of the year and the 42nd of his career in the Open Era.

References

External links
 ITF tournament edition details

 

 
World Championship Tennis Finals
World Championship Tennis Finals
World Championship Tennis Finals
WCT Finals